Méagui is a city in south-western Ivory Coast. It is a sub-prefecture of and the seat of Méagui Department in Nawa Region, Bas-Sassandra District. Méagui is also a commune.

In 2021, the population of the sub-prefecture of Méagui was 153,483.

Villages
The villages of the sub-prefecture of Méagui and their population in 2014 are:

References

Sub-prefectures of Nawa Region
Communes of Nawa Region